The 2009 Sony Ericsson WTA Tour was the 37th season since the founding of the Women's Tennis Association. It commenced on January 5, 2009, and concluded on November 8, 2009, after 56 events.

Serena Williams and Dinara Safina engaged in a battle for the year-end No. 1 ranking, with Williams eventually coming out on top after winning the WTA Tour Championships. She won two Grand Slam titles during the year. Safina ascended to No. 1 in April and held it for much of the rest of the season. Svetlana Kuznetsova, Caroline Wozniacki and Elena Dementieva also enjoyed successful years in 2009.

Jelena Janković also battled with inconsistent results, falling from No. 1 in January to No. 8 by November.

Kim Clijsters returned to competitive tennis in August after giving birth to her daughter, and won the US Open title. Maria Sharapova made her comeback in May, having missed all tournaments since the summer of 2008, and rose back into the top 20.

Former world No. 1 Amélie Mauresmo announced her retirement at the end of the season, while Ai Sugiyama and Nathalie Dechy were among other notable players who retired during the year.

Tour reforms 
The 2009 season saw the Women's Tennis Association undergo what was described as "its most sweeping reforms in history", with the aim of creating a more fan friendly structure to the Tour, to reduce player withdrawals, and increase player commitment in the biggest tournaments.

The main features of the new "Roadmap" calendar saw the abolition of the previous Tier system, which were replaced by Premier and International tournaments. 20 Premier events were to be held throughout the season, down from the 26 Tier I and Tier II events that were held in 2008. Of those 20, four—the BNP Paribas Open in Indian Wells, the Sony Ericsson Open in Miami, the Mutua Madrileña Madrid Open in Madrid, and the China Open in Beijing—would be mandatory, offering $4.5 million in prize money. Along with that were five other tournaments, the Premier 5s, which offered $2 million in prize money. Ten other Premier tournaments were also held throughout the season. These would all lead up to the Sony Ericsson Championships in Doha, Qatar, which boasted a $4.5 million total prize fund.

In addition, 30 International events were created to replace the previous Tier III and IV categories. The top performers in the Race to the Sony Ericsson Championships who won an International title during the season were to be eligible to compete in the season-ending Commonwealth Bank Tournament of Champions, which was held the week after the Sony Ericsson Championships.

The Roadmap calendar also saw a 30% increase in the length off the off-season, from 7 to 9 weeks, with the season ending in October, as well as more breaks between the bigger tournaments throughout the season, an increase in back-to-back events, a decrease in player commitment, a limitation on top player participation in International tournaments and stronger penalties for top players who miss Premier tournament commitments.

The WTA Tour also moved more closely to a combined Tour with the ATP, with 31% of events being combined men and women events, and equal prize money being offered at ten of the biggest events throughout the season. Total prize money increased to $86 million, which was once again a record high, up from $67 million the previous year.

With the changes came a new ranking system, which now included the player's best-performing 16 events (down from 17), including the four Grand Slam tournaments and the four mandatory events for all players who qualified by ranking, and the awarding of "zero pointers" for top players missing commitments at the biggest events.

Lastly, the Women's Tennis Association also announced that On Court Coaching would be included in all events on the Roadmap calendar. Having been tested in many events since 2006, the decision to approve the move was made to increase the relationship between the viewer and the sport, with viewers being able to listen in on conversations between players and their coaches, who are required to wear a microphone during the exchange. Players were allowed to request their coach once per set, at a changeover or at the end of the set, or when the opposing player was taking a medical timeout or toilet break.

Season summary

Singles 
Elena Dementieva started the season on a hot streak, taking the title in Sydney, beating Dinara Safina in the final, as well as winning a smaller tournament in Auckland the week before, putting her as a firm contender at the season's opening Grand Slam, the Australian Open.

During the Australian Open fortnight, Venus Williams became the first big casualty when she lost in the second round to Carla Suárez Navarro. Jelena Dokić made a fairytale run to the quarterfinals, the furthest she'd been in a Grand Slam event since 2002, and world No. 1 Jelena Janković lost in the fourth round to Marion Bartoli. In the quarterfinals, Dokić's run was ended by Safina, with Vera Zvonareva, Dementieva and Serena Williams also moving through. Williams eventually beat Safina in a match that saw the No. 1 ranking on the line, to win her tenth Grand Slam title, and fourth at the Australian Open, and sealing her return to the No. 1 spot.

February saw Amélie Mauresmo overcome her struggling form in the previous two seasons to win the Premier event in Paris. Venus Williams also won the Roadmap's first Premier 5 event in Dubai, beating surprise finalist Virginie Razzano.

At the mandatory Indian Wells, Zvonareva won her biggest career title thus far with a win over Ivanovic in the final. Safina had another chance to reach No. 1 after this tournament, but lost to Victoria Azarenka. Azarenka won the event in Miami, stopping Serena Williams achieving a record-breaking sixth title there. Janković continued her struggles with her second straight loss, with Safina, Zvonareva and Ivanovic also losing early.

Safina ascended to the No. 1 ranking on April 20 despite not playing the previous week, due to Williams not defending her title. Playing in her first tournament as the No. 1, Safina lost in the final of Stuttgart to Kuznetsova, before avenging the loss by beating Kuznetsova in the Rome final. In the final major warm-up event, Safina beat Caroline Wozniacki to win Madrid.

After a strong clay season, Safina was the favourite to win her first Grand Slam at the French Open, and she eventually moved through to the finals in the top half. On the bottom half, Kuznetsova came through, beating Serena Williams in the quarterfinals, to set up the third meeting between the two during the clay season. With Safina heavily favoured, Kuznetsova won the title for her second Grand Slam title in singles, and first since the US Open in 2004. Elsewhere, in a fortnight of surprises, Dominika Cibulková reached her first Grand Slam semifinal, beating Maria Sharapova in the quarterfinals, who was returning from a lengthy lay-off from shoulder surgery recovery. Samantha Stosur also reached her first Grand Slam semifinal, taking down Elena Dementieva in the second round. Defending champion Ana Ivanovic lost to Azarenka in the fourth round, a loss which dropped her out of the top 10 in the world.

The top four seeds all reached the semifinals at Wimbledon, the first time it had happened since 2006. The first week did, however, see French Open champion Kuznetsova upset by Sabine Lisicki on her way to her first Grand Slam quarterfinal, and Janković lose to American teenager Melanie Oudin. The semifinals were direct contrasts to each other, with Venus Williams thrashing Safina in the top half semifinal, and Serena Williams beating Dementieva in an epic 8–6 in the third encounter. The final was the fourth all-Williams Wimbledon final, and the second in a row. Serena avenged her loss to Venus in last year's final to win her third Wimbledon title, first since 2003, and eleventh Grand Slam title overall.

The US Open Series turned out to be an open race, with five different champions being crowned at the tournaments. Eventually, it went to Toronto champion Elena Dementieva, who also reached the semifinals in Cincinnati and Stanford. Flavia Pennetta finished second after winning Los Angeles and reaching the semifinals in Cincinnati and New Haven, results which saw her break into the top 10. Cincinnati champion Jelena Janković came third. Also during the summer hardcourt season, Kim Clijsters made her return to competitive tennis in Cincinnati after giving birth.

At the US Open, Caroline Wozniacki reached her first Grand Slam final after a half of upsets which saw Safina, Janković and Dementieva all lose in the first week. Melanie Oudin reached her first major quarterfinal by defeating Dementieva, Sharapova and Petrova back-to-back, while Yanina Wickmayer reached her first semifinal at this level. In the bottom half, Clijsters came through after defeating Venus Williams in the fourth round, and later her sister Serena in the semifinals, in a match that ended with Williams receiving a point penalty, and later a fine, for unsportsmanlike conduct after reacting to a foot fault called by the linesperson. In the final, Clijsters beat Wozniacki to win her second Grand Slam title in only her third tournament back, and become the first mother to win a Grand Slam title since Evonne Goolagong Cawley in 1980.

The fall season saw Maria Sharapova win her first title since returning from her shoulder surgery in Tokyo. Kimiko Date-Krumm provided a notable story, becoming the second oldest player to ever win a title in the Open Era in Seoul. Svetlana Kuznetsova won the event in Beijing, beating Agnieszka Radwańska in the final. Following that tournament, Safina surrendered her No. 1 ranking to Serena Williams, before regaining it the week prior to the WTA Tour Championships. This meant that the year-end No. 1 would be decided in Doha, with whoever performed better in the tournament achieving the position. Safina retired in her first match, while Williams went on to win the title to become the year-end No. 1 for only the second time, after 2002.

Schedule 
This is the complete schedule of events on the 2009 Sony Ericsson WTA Tour, with player progression documented from the quarterfinals stage.

Key

January

February

March

April

May

June

July

August

September

October

November

Statistical information 
These tables present the number of singles (S), doubles (D), and mixed doubles (X) titles won by each player and each nation during the season, within all the tournament categories of the 2009 WTA Tour: the Grand Slam tournaments, the Year-end championships, the WTA Premier tournaments and the WTA International tournaments. The players/nations are sorted by:

 total number of titles (a doubles title won by two players representing the same nation counts as only one win for the nation);
 highest amount of highest category tournaments (for example, having a single Grand Slam gives preference over any kind of combination without a Grand Slam title); 
 a singles > doubles > mixed doubles hierarchy; 
 alphabetical order (by family names for players).

Titles won by player

Titles won by nation

Titles information 
The following players won their first singles title:
  Victoria Azarenka – Brisbane
  Petra Kvitová – Hobart
  María José Martínez Sánchez – Bogotá
  Sabine Lisicki – Charleston
  Yanina Wickmayer – Estoril
  Alexandra Dulgheru – Warsaw
  Aravane Rezaï – Strasbourg
  Magdaléna Rybáriková – Birmingham
  Andrea Petkovic – Bad Gastein
  Vera Dushevina – Istanbul
  Melinda Czink – Quebec City
  Samantha Stosur – Osaka
  Timea Bacsinszky – Luxembourg City

The following players completed a successful singles title defence:
  Tamarine Tanasugarn – 's-Hertogenbosch
  Caroline Wozniacki – New Haven

Rankings

Singles 
The following is the 2009 top 20 in the Race To The Championships. Premier Mandatory Events are counted even if the player did not compete, if there is no injury excuse, it is counted as one of their events, when you are in the top 10. Players in gold are players who competed in the 2009 WTA Tour Championships.

Number 1 ranking

Doubles

Number 1 ranking

WTA prize money leaders 
Serena Williams topped the money list for the 2nd consecutive season and for the 3rd time overall. In doing so, she also became the first woman to win $6,000,000 in a single season. The top-12 players earned over $1,000,000.

As of 16 November 2009

1 Only for 2008 year-end top 10, Certain players receive fines for skipping events

Statistics leaders 
As of November 16, 2009. Source

Points distribution

Retirements 
Following are notable players who announced their retirement from the Sony Ericsson WTA Tour during the 2009 season:
  Nathalie Dechy The former world number 11 and 2006–2007 US Open doubles champion announced her retirement from professional tennis in July 2009.
  Eva Fislová The former world number 98 announced her retirement in 2009.
  Jamea Jackson The former world number 45 announced her retirement from professional tennis in August 2009.
  Émilie Loit The former world number 27 announced her retirement in 2009.
  Amélie Mauresmo The former world number 1 2006 Australian Open and Wimbledon champion announced her retirement from professional tennis in December 2009.
  Akiko Morigami The former world number 41 announced her retirement in 2009.
  Tzipora Obziler The former world number 75 announced her retirement in 2009.
  María Emilia Salerni The former world number 65 announced her retirement in 2009.
  Milagros Sequera The former world number 48 announced her retirement in 2009.
  Bryanne Stewart The former doubles world number 16 announced her retirement in 2009.
  Ai Sugiyama The former doubles world number 1 three Grand Slam women's doubles titles announced her retirement from professional tennis in October 2009.

Awards 
The winners of the 2009 WTA Awards were announced on 24 March 2010, during a special ceremony at the Sony Ericsson Open.

 Player of the Year – Serena Williams
 Doubles Team of the Year – Serena Williams & Venus Williams
 Most Improved Player – Yanina Wickmayer
 Comeback Player of the Year – Kim Clijsters
 Newcomer of the Year – Melanie Oudin
 Karen Krantzcke Sportsmanship Award – Kim Clijsters
 Player Service Award – Liezel Huber
 Fan Favorite Singles Player of the Year – Elena Dementieva
 Fan Favorite Doubles Team of the Year – Serena Williams & Venus Williams
 Favorite Premier Tournament – BNP Paribas Open (Indian Wells)
 Favorite International Tournament – Abierto Mexicano Telcel (Acapulco)

See also 
 2009 ATP World Tour
 2009 WTA Premier tournaments
 2009 ITF Women's Circuit
 Women's Tennis Association
 International Tennis Federation

References

External links 
 Women's Tennis Association (WTA) official website
 International Tennis Federation (ITF) official website

 
WTA Tour
WTA Tour seasons